Vasily Yaroslavich (1241 – January 1276) was a Grand Duke of Vladimir. He was the youngest son of Yaroslav II, he was given Kostroma by his uncle Svyatoslav III in 1246. As the eldest surviving grandson of Vsevolod III, he succeeded to Vladimir in 1272 and to Novgorod the following year. He was one of the first princes who didn't bother to leave their own town (i.e., Kostroma) and settle in Vladimir. His descendants continued to rule Kostroma for half a century after his death in January 1276.

See also
 Rulers of Russia family tree

1241 births
1276 deaths
Grand Princes of Vladimir
Rurik dynasty
Yurievichi family
13th-century princes in Kievan Rus'
Eastern Orthodox monarchs